Harold Chapman was a professional rugby league footballer who played in the 1920s and 1930s.

Playing career

County League appearances
Harold Chapman played in Castleford's victory in the Yorkshire County League during the 1932–33 season.

Club career
Harold Chapman played in Castleford's defeat by Dewsbury in the 1929 Challenge Cup semi-final during 1928–29 season.

References

External links
Search for "Chapman" at rugbyleagueproject.org
Harold Chapman Memory Box Search at archive.castigersheritage.com

Castleford Tigers players
English rugby league players
Place of birth missing
Place of death missing
Rugby league wingers
Year of birth missing
Year of death missing